Test match cricket has a history from the first Test match played in 1877, to date.

History of Test cricket from 1877 to 1883
History of Test cricket from 1884 to 1889
History of Test cricket from 1890 to 1900
History of Test cricket from 1901 to 1914